Leonardo Capotosti (born 24 July 1988) is an Italian male 400 metres hurdler.

Biography

His best result at the international senior level was the third place in the 2015 European Team Championships Super League final. He also won two national championships at individual senior level, Italian Athletics Championships where he, in 2018, reached his eleventh consecutive final in the 400 metres hurdles race.

Achievements

National titles
 Italian Athletics Championships
 400 metres hurdles: 2014, 2015

See also
 Italy at the European Cup (athletics)

References

External links
 

1988 births
Living people
Italian male hurdlers
Athletics competitors of Fiamme Gialle